Hideyuki Kikuchi's Vampire Hunter D, known simply as  in Japan, is a manga adaptation of the Vampire Hunter D novel series by acclaimed horror writer, Hideyuki Kikuchi.

Announced at Anime Expo 2006, the Vampire Hunter D manga is a collaboration between Hideyuki Kikuchi and Digital Manga Publishing. Kikuchi, who has always had a close relationship with his fans, has personally selected doujinshi artist Saiko Takaki as illustrator for the project.
 
The first volume was published on 14 November 2007, and was subsequently nominated as the third best new seinen manga of 2007 in an About.com reader's poll, and placed fifth in the SPJA Industry Awards in the "best action manga" category.

The plan was to adapt the entire catalogue of Vampire Hunter D novels into manga form. However, the series was officially reported to be cancelled by DMP in November 2015, with no plans to release volume 8 in the USA.
Last adapted volume 8 is available in English only digital since April 17, 2018 by Publisher KADOKAWA via BookWalker.

Volume 1 
Title: Hideyuki Kikuchi's Vampire Hunter D Volume 1
Original Story: Hideyuki Kikuchi
Adaptation: Saiko Takaki
Artist: Saiko Takaki
Translator: Earl Gertwagen
Japanese release date: November 14, 2007
Japanese 
English release date: November 25, 2007
English 

The year is 12,090 A.D., and what little is left of humanity has finally crawled out from the ashes of war and destruction. From the darkness of the fallout, mutants and a race of vampires known as the Nobility have spawned. They rule the weak with no remorse. Once bitten by a Nobility, one is cursed to become a member of the undead. Villagers cower in fear, hoping and praying for a savior to rid them of their undying nightmare. All they have to battle this danger is a different kind of danger – a Vampire Hunter.

Enter D – a lone, mysterious Vampire Hunter sought out by the desperate Doris Lang. Bitten by the vampire lord Count Lee, Doris is destined to her eternal fate… Can D deliver her from her curse and bring her to salvation, or will she forever be part of the unholy dead?

Differences between the novel and film
While the story remains intact, the manga takes some liberties with the narrative and character designs. Larmica returns to being blonde, but Doris is depicted with Red hair in the colored splash page after the cover. Certain events are shuffled around while others are slightly changed to take place at the same time as another. In the original Novel, Greco is killed by Larmica, but in the manga he is fatally wounded by Rei Ginsei (much like in the film). D's fight against Golem, Gimlet and Chullah remains the same as the novel (though Chullah may have survived this time around) while his triumph over Rei is slightly different (in the novel, D exploited Rei Ginsei's powers to finish the mutant, while in the manga he severs Rei's other hand, causing him to be decapitated by his own shrike blade).
The ending appears to take elements from both the novel and film, in which D is seen safe and sound, leaving on horse back (in the novel, he doesn't appear after his conversation with Larmica-the film has Doris and Dan bidding their bodyguard farewell). D left his pendant in the care of Dan, not even returning to retrieve it after he vanquishes Count Lee.

Volume 2 
Title: Hideyuki Kikuchi's Vampire Hunter D Volume 2
Original Story: Hideyuki Kikuchi
Adaptation: Saiko Takaki
Artist: Saiko Takaki
Translator: Duane Johnson
Japanese release date: June 6, 2008
Japanese 
English release date: June 24, 2008
English 

When vampires begin hunting in daylight, the villagers of a small town must rely on D to solve the mystery – but will his efforts uncover an even more terrifying secret from the past?

This all-new manga adapts Raiser of Gales – the second Vampire Hunter D adventure!

Volume 3 
Title: Hideyuki Kikuchi's Vampire Hunter D Volume 3
Original Story: Hideyuki Kikuchi
Adaptation: Saiko Takaki
Artist: Saiko Takaki
Translator: Duane Johnson
Japanese release date: May 26, 2009
Japanese 
English release date: June 2, 2009
English 

The vampire hunter known only as D has been hired by a wealthy, dying man to find his daughter, who was kidnapped by the powerful vampire Lord Meier Link. Though humans speak well of Meier Link, the price on his head is too high for D to ignore and he sets out to save her before she can be turned into an undead creature of the night. In the nightmare world of 12090 A.D., finding Meier Link before he reaches the spaceport in the Clayborn States and gets off the planet will be hard enough, but D has more than just Meier Link to worry about. The dying man is taking no chances, and has also enlisted the Marcus family, a renegade clan of ruthless mercenaries who don't care who they kill as long as they get paid!

Hideyuki Kikuchi's Vampire Hunter D Volume 3 adapts Demon Deathchase, the third Vampire Hunter D light novel.

Volume 4 
Title: Hideyuki Kikuchi's Vampire Hunter D Volume 4
Original story: Hideyuki Kikuchi
Adaption: Saiko Takaki
Artist: Saiko Takaki
Translator: Duane Johnson
Japanese release date: November 21, 2009
Japanese 
English release date: December 30, 2009
English 

The City, a tiny metropolis of a few hundred sheltered citizens floating serenely on a seemingly random course a few feet above the ground, has long been thought safe from the predation of marauding monsters. It seems like a paradise - a paradise shattered when an invasion of an apparent vampire threatens the small haven! While the Vampire Hunter known only as "D" struggles to exterminate the scourge, a former denizen of the city, the attractive Lori Knight, and the brash John M. Brasselli Pluto VIII seize control of the city, lurching it onto a new and deadly course. D's travails are just the beginning...

Hideyuki Kikuchi's Vampire Hunter D Volume 4 adapts Tale of the Dead Town, the fourth Vampire Hunter D light novel.

Volume 5 
Title: Hideyuki Kikuchi's Vampire Hunter D Volume 5
Original story: Hideyuki Kikuchi
Adaption: Saiko Takaki
Artist: Saiko Takaki
Translator: Duane Johnson
Japanese release date: December 22, 2010
Japanese 
English release date: December 29, 2010
English 

In a secluded village void of the dangers that come during the night, there lies an ageless sleeping beauty once bitten by a vampire 30 years ago. She is the key that holds the delicate balance in the village in which mortals and the Nobility can coexist. But when the wandering vampire known as “D” is drawn to the town by recurring dreams of the mysterious girl, the town will stop at nothing to protect that tranquil balance and stop the vampire hunter’s in his tracks.

Hideyuki Kikuchi's Vampire Hunter D Volume 5 adapts The Stuff of Dreams, the fifth Vampire Hunter D light novel.

Volume 6 
Title: Hideyuki Kikuchi's Vampire Hunter D Volume 6
Original story: Hideyuki Kikuchi
Adaption: Saiko Takaki
Artist: Saiko Takaki
Translator: Duane Johnson
Japanese release date: January 23, 2012
Japanese 
English release date:  February 7, 2012
English 

The Nobility have captured a young Frontierswoman named Tae and held her captive for 8 years, and her prison—the remote Castle Gradinia—can only be accessed by those brave (or senseless) enough to cross into the no-man's-land known as the Outer Frontier. The mysterious "people finder" Granny Viper has been charged with the recovery of the girl...but can she trust her hired escorts, the notoriously shifty Bullow Brothers? In a race across treacherous terrain, it will be up to D to lead the charge and level all enemies on this rescue mission!

Hideyuki Kikuchi's Vampire Hunter D Volume 6 adapts Pilgrimage of the Sacred and the Profane, the sixth Vampire Hunter D light novel.

Volume 7 
Title: Hideyuki Kikuchi's Vampire Hunter D Volume 7
Original story: Hideyuki Kikuchi
Adaption: Saiko Takaki
Artist: Saiko Takaki
Translator: Sachiko Sato
Japanese release date: July 23, 2013
Japanese 
English release date: June 12, 2013
English 

In a fleeting last breath, a beautiful woman on her deathbed hands a strange gemstone to D and asks that he deliver it to her sister in a remote North Sea fishing village. As D cuts across never-ending expanses of Frontier in search of his seaside destination, he is relentlessly attacked by wave after wave of mercenary and monster...all employed by the man who murdered the young girl. In order to grant a dying wish, D must find a way to keep this priceless jewel out of everyone's covetous reach, and all without sacrificing his own life!

Hideyuki Kikuchi's Vampire Hunter D Volume 7 adapts Mysterious Journey to the North Sea, the seventh Vampire Hunter D light novel.

Volume 8 
Title: Hideyuki Kikuchi's Vampire Hunter D Volume 8
Original story: Hideyuki Kikuchi
Adaption: Saiko Takaki
Artist: Saiko Takaki
Translator: Sachiko Sato
Japanese release Date: September 23, 2014
Japanese 
English release date: April 17, 2018
English ISBN  –

When the sister of a beautiful, murdered woman summons D to the village of Florence, the Hunter finds the once-thriving resort town in the grip of a vicious plague that seems to originate from the nearby sea. In a race against time, D must look back to a decadent age nearly a thousand years prior, when Florence's pleasure-seeking vampire inhabitants were banished by a lone soul dressed in black. Did the single standout from this mass exodus—the Baron Meinster—curse the town upon meeting his end at the hands of the mysterious traveler?

Hideyuki Kikuchi's Vampire Hunter D Volume 8 adapts Mysterious Journey to the North Sea, the seventh Vampire Hunter D light novel.

See also 

List of comics based on fiction

References

External links
Official website for the manga 
Hideyuki Kikuichi's Vampire Hunter D at DMP Books 
Falcon Tree - Saiko Takaki's Personal Website (Japanese)

2007 manga
Comics based on fiction
Digital Manga Publishing titles
Horror anime and manga
Media Factory manga
Post-apocalyptic anime and manga
Supernatural anime and manga
Vampire Hunter D
Vampires in anime and manga